The 1972 NCAA University Division basketball tournament involved 25 schools playing in single-elimination play to determine the national champion of NCAA University Division (now Division I) college basketball. It began on Saturday, March 11, and ended with the championship game in Los Angeles on Saturday, March 25. A total of 29 games were played, including a third-place game in each region and a national third-place game.

Led by longtime head coach John Wooden, the undefeated UCLA Bruins won the national title with an 81–76 victory in the final game over Florida State, coached by Hugh Durham. Sophomore center Bill Walton of UCLA was named the tournament's Most Outstanding Player; the first of two consecutive.

In a historically significant note, the Southwestern Louisiana Ragin' Cajuns made the tournament in their first season of eligibility for postseason play; the next to achieve this feat was North Dakota State in 2009. SW Louisiana also made the tournament in 1973, but due to major infractions that resulted in the basketball program receiving the NCAA death penalty (and very nearly expelled from the NCAA altogether), both appearances have since been vacated and the records expunged.

This was the last year in which the championship game was played on Saturday; it moved to Monday night in 1973.

Schedule and venues
The following are the sites that were selected to host each round of the 1972 tournament:

First round
March 11
East Region
 Alumni Hall, Jamaica, New York
 Jadwin Gymnasium, Princeton, New Jersey
 William & Mary Hall, Williamsburg, Virginia
Mideast Region
 Stokely Athletic Center, Knoxville, Tennessee
Midwest Region
 Pan American Center, Las Cruces, New Mexico
West Region
 ASISU Minidome, Pocatello, Idaho

Regional semifinals, 3rd-place games, and finals (Sweet Sixteen and Elite Eight)
March 16 and 18
East Regional, WVU Coliseum, Morgantown, West Virginia
Mideast Regional, University of Dayton Arena, Dayton, Ohio
Midwest Regional, Hilton Coliseum, Ames, Iowa
West Regional, Marriott Center, Provo, Utah

National semifinals, 3rd-place game, and championship (Final Four and championship)
March 23 and 25
Los Angeles Memorial Sports Arena, Los Angeles, California

For the second time, the city of Los Angeles and the LA Memorial Sports Arena hosted the Final Four. To date, this is the last Final Four to be held in the city, although the city and region continue to host games to this day. The tournament saw five new venues and three new host cities used for the first time. For the first time, the tournament came to the campus of Iowa State University and the Hilton Coliseum, then in its first year of operation. The first games held in the state of Tennessee were held this year at the Stokely Athletic Center on the campus of the University of Tennessee in Knoxville. For the third time, games were held in the state of Virginia, this time at William & Mary Hall on the campus of the College of William & Mary.

Games were held at the brand-new Marriott Center, then the largest basketball arena in the country, on the campus of Brigham Young University in Provo, Utah, replacing the Smith Fieldhouse. And at Idaho State University in Pocatello, games were held in the two-year-old Minidome, having previously been played at Reed Gym in 1957. To date, this is the last time games were held at either the Hilton Coliseum or at Jadwin Gymnasium on the campus of Princeton University, the only Ivy League gymnasium other than the Palestra used in the tournament.

Teams

Bracket
* – Denotes overtime period

East region

Mideast region

Midwest region

West region

Final Four

See also
 1972 NCAA College Division basketball tournament
 1972 National Invitation Tournament
 1972 NAIA Division I men's basketball tournament
 1972 National Women's Invitation Tournament

References

NCAA Division I men's basketball tournament
Ncaa
NCAA Division I men's basketball tournament
NCAA Division I men's basketball tournament
NCAA Division I men's basketball tournament